The 2003–04 season was Klubi i Futbollit Tirana's 65th competitive season, 65th consecutive season in the Kategoria Superiore and 83rd year in existence as a football club.

Season overview
Tirana started its 65th competitive season in mid-July, where was going to face the Georgian side Dinamo Tbilisi for the first qualifying round of 2003–04 UEFA Champions League. In the first leg on 16 July 2003, Tirana almost lose the hopes when was beaten 3–0 at Boris Paichadze Dinamo Arena. In the returning leg at Qemal Stafa Stadium nine days later, Tirana would perform one of the best come-backs in Champions League history by beating Dinamo Tbilisi 3–0 in the regular time. Extra time ended in the same level, but Tirana managed to complete the come-back by eliminating them via penalty shootout. In the second qualifying round, Tirana was easily defeated by Austrian side GAK, who eliminated the capital side with the aggregate 7–2. Tirana lost the first match at home 1–5 and then the second at Sportzentrum Weinzödl with the result 2–1.

Tirana won the first trophy of the season on 16 August where they beat the cross-town rivals Dinamo Tirana to grab their 4th Albanian Supercup title. Sina, Halili and Agolli sealed the victory with their goals. Tirana commenced their domestic campaign on 23 August with a 0–6 away win against Lushnja at neutral ground of Tomori Stadium, which was followed with a 0–3 away win against Flamurtari Vlorë. On 12 September, Tirana recorded its biggest win of the season by scoring 7–1 against Besa Kavajë at the Selman Stërmasi Stadium. The goals were scored by seven different players.

In the second round of 2003–04 Albanian Cup, Tirana easily managed to eliminate Turbina Cërrik with the aggregate 8–2. On 25 October, Sulejman Mema resigned as the coach of Tirana after ending the month with 2 loses and 2 draws, with Tirana falling down at 4th place. He was replaced by Mirel Josa, a former player who represented KF Tirana for ten years from 1980 to 1990. Josa started extremely well, collecting six consecutive win in the league during the second phrase, including a 1–0 win over the rivals Partizani Tirana. Also in November, Tirana beat Lushnja 3–0 on aggregate to go into the quarter-finals of Albanian Cup. On 20 December, Tirana defeated Dinamo 5–1 at home, a result which was followed by a 1–1 draw against Elbasani, with Tirana ending the first part of the season in the first place, with a considerable gap.

Tirana started 2004 with a 1–1 draw against Lushnja on 24 January. Six days later, Tirana gained its first win of the new year, defeating Flamurtari 0–2 in Vlorë. During this year, Tirana recorded six consecutive wins from 30 January to 13 March. On 19 March, in the match against Dinamo Tirana, Tirana was defeated for the time in 2004 with the result 3–0. Also in March, Tirana progressed in semi-finals of the Albanian Cup by beating Besa Kavajë in the quarter-final with the aggregate 5–2, winning both matches. In April, Tirana managed to win four out of four league matches, being closer to win the league title. Also during this month, Tirana was eliminated by Dinamo Tirana in semi-final of the cup, with Dinamo qualifying in the final with the aggregate 5–2, winning both matches.

In the final match of the season, Tirana returned in winning ways after four consecutive league matches without a win by defeating Elbasani 2–5 at Ruzhdi Bizhuta Stadium. Tirana ended the season in the first place with 80 points from 36 matches, being crowned the Albanian champions for the 22nd time in history. By winning the league, Tirana also qualified for the next season's UEFA Champions League.

Squad

Squad information

Competitions

Albanian Supercup

Kategoria Superiore

League table

Results summary

Results by round

Matches

Albanian Cup

Second round

Third round

Quarter-finals

Semi-finals

UEFA Champions League

First qualifying round

Second qualifying round

Statistics

Squad stats
{|class="wikitable" style="text-align: center;"
|-
!
! style="width:70px;"|League
! style="width:70px;"|Europe
! style="width:70px;"|Cup
! style="width:70px;"|Supercup
! style="width:70px;"|Total Stats
|-
|align=left|Games played       ||36 || 4 || 8 || 1 || 49
|-
|align=left|Games won          ||24 || 1 || 6 || 1 || 32
|-
|align=left|Games drawn        || 8 || 0 || 0 || 0 || 8
|-
|align=left|Games lost         || 4 || 3 || 2 || 0 || 9
|-
|align=left|Goals scored       ||90 || 5 ||18 || 3 || 116
|-
|align=left|Goals conceded     ||36 ||10 || 9 || 0 || 55
|-
|align=left|Goal difference    ||54 ||–5 || 9 || 3 || 61
|-
|align=left|Clean sheets       ||13 || 1 || 3 || 1 || 18
|-

Top scorers

Last updated: 17 November 2015

Notes

References

External links
Official website

KF Tirana seasons
Tirana
Albanian football championship-winning seasons